Argyrotaenia iopsamma is a species of moth of the family Tortricidae. It is found in São Paulo, Brazil.

References

iopsamma
Endemic fauna of Brazil
Moths of South America
Tortricidae of South America
Moths described in 1931